The 2017 Virginia lieutenant gubernatorial election was held on November 7, 2017. After the party primary elections were held, the major party nominees were Jill Vogel (Republican) and Justin Fairfax (Democrat). The incumbent Lieutenant Governor, Democrat Ralph Northam, declined to run for re-election in order to run for Governor. In the general election on November 7, 2017, Democratic nominee Justin Fairfax defeated Republican state Senator Jill Vogel to become the 41st Lieutenant Governor of Virginia.

Democratic primary

Nominee

Justin Fairfax, former Assistant United States Attorney and candidate for Attorney General in 2013

Eliminated in primary

Susan Platt, former chief of staff to Joe Biden
Gene Rossi, former Assistant United States Attorney and former gubernatorial aide

Declined

David Bowers, former mayor of Roanoke and nominee for VA-06 in 1998
Anne Holton, former Virginia Secretary of Education, former Juvenile and Domestic Relations District Court Judge, and wife of Senator Tim Kaine
Dwight C. Jones, former Mayor of Richmond and former chair of the Democratic Party of Virginia
Molly Joseph Ward, Secretary of Natural Resources and former mayor of Hampton
Kenny Alexander, Mayor of Norfolk and former state senator
Barbara Favola, state senator
Eileen Filler-Corn, state delegate
Mike Hamlar, businessman and candidate for the State Senate in 2015
Charniele Herring, state delegate, former chair of the Democratic Party of Virginia, and candidate for VA-08 in 2014
Jennifer McClellan, state senator
Ralph Northam, incumbent Lieutenant Governor (running for Governor)
Adam Parkhomenko, National Field Director for the Democratic National Committee, co-founder of Ready for Hillary and candidate for the State House in 2009
Chap Petersen, state senator and candidate for Lieutenant Governor in 2005
Sam Rasoul, state delegate and nominee for VA-06 in 2008
Levar Stoney, Mayor of Richmond and former Secretary of the Commonwealth of Virginia
Jennifer Wexton, state senator (running for Congress)

Endorsements

Results

Republican primary

Candidates

Nominee
Jill Vogel, State Senator

Eliminated in primary
Glenn Davis, state delegate
Bryce Reeves, state senator

Declined
Ben Cline, state delegate
Micah Edmond, former congressional aide and nominee for VA-08 in 2014
Shak Hill, financial consultant and candidate for the U.S. Senate in 2014
Israel O'Quinn, state delegate
Danny Vargas, businessman and candidate for the State House in 2015
E. W. Jackson, pastor, conservative activist, candidate for the U.S. Senate in 2012 and nominee for Lieutenant Governor in 2013 (endorsed Vogel)
Ken Peterson, Goochland County Supervisor
David Ramadan, former state delegate (endorsed Vogel)
Pete Snyder, technology executive and candidate for Lieutenant Governor in 2013
Corey Stewart, Chairman of the Prince William Board of County Supervisors and candidate for Lieutenant Governor in 2013 (running for Governor)
Scott Taylor, U.S. Representative (endorsed Reeves)

Endorsements

Polling

Results

General election

Endorsements

Polling

With Bryce Reeves

With Glenn Davis

Results

See also
2017 Virginia elections
2017 Virginia gubernatorial election
2017 Virginia Attorney General election
2017 United States gubernatorial elections

References

External links
Official campaign websites (Archived)
Justin Fairfax
Jill Vogel
Glen Davis
Susan Platt
Bryce Reeves
Gene Rossi

Lieutenant governor
2017
Virginia lieutenant gubernatorial election
Virginia